The Assarel mine is a large copper mine located in western Bulgaria in Sofia Province. Assarel represents one of the largest copper reserves in Bulgaria as well as in the world, given its estimated reserves of 318 million tonnes of ore containing about 0.36% copper.

References 

Copper mines in Bulgaria